Zorya-Mashproekt is a research and production complex that specializes in a gas turbine construction. The complex is located in the city of Mykolaiv, Ukraine and is part of the Ukrainian Defense Industries (Ukroboronprom) state corporation.

History
The idea of creating a factory in production of steam turbines in Ukraine arose soon after World War II. On July 9, 1946 the Soviet government adopted a decision on establishing of the factory in Mykolaiv, while the city authorities found a spot in the southeastern suburbs of the city near a military airfield Kulbakine. The preparatory works started out in March 1948, while the construction stretched out for the next five years. Initially the factory was called the Southern Turbine Plant.

Following the 2014 Crimean crisis, the Ukrainians refused to supply the Russian Navy with marine gas turbines from Zorya-Mashproekt, and so NPO Saturn has been commissioned to design new engines for the Admiral Gorshkov and Admiral Grigorovich-class frigates.

See also
 FC Torpedo Mykolaiv
 Ivchenko-Progress

References

External links
 Official website (English version)
 Zorya-Mashproekt at the military exhibition in Russia. "Military Panorama".
 Baklin, D. Zorya, Gazprom, and Russian Navy. December 11, 2012.

Defence companies of the Soviet Union
Manufacturing companies established in 1953
Defence companies of Ukraine
1953 establishments in Ukraine
Gas turbine manufacturers
Companies based in Mykolaiv
Engine manufacturers of Ukraine
Ukrainian brands
Engine manufacturers of the Soviet Union
Ukroboronprom